James Harper-Orr (18 October 1878 – 19 March 1956) was a Scottish cricketer and field hockey player who competed in the 1908 Summer Olympics.

Playing career

In 1908 Harper-Orr won the bronze medal as member of the Scotland field hockey team.

He competed for the Scotland national cricket team in 3 matches during 1912–13, scoring 91 runs over five innings.

In 1911 he is listed as living at 67 Northumberland Street in Edinburgh's Second New Town.

References

External links
 
profile

1878 births
1956 deaths
Scottish male field hockey players
Olympic field hockey players of Great Britain
British male field hockey players
Field hockey players at the 1908 Summer Olympics
Olympic bronze medallists for Great Britain
Olympic medalists in field hockey
Scottish Olympic medallists
Scottish cricketers
Medalists at the 1908 Summer Olympics
People educated at Loretto School, Musselburgh
Alumni of Trinity College, Oxford